Seramiasht F.C. is a football team from Kabul, Afghanistan. They participated in the Afghan Premier League, currently being part of Kabul Premier League.

Squad 2010–11

Achievements

None

References

Football clubs in Afghanistan
Sport in Kabul
1995 establishments in Afghanistan